"Got a Little Drunk" is a song by Norwegian urban duo Madcon. The song was released as a digital download in Norway on 5 May 2017 by Sony Music Entertainment. The song peaked at number 38 on the Norwegian Singles Chart.

Music video
A music video to accompany the release of "Got a Little Drunk" was first released onto YouTube on 5 May 2017 at a total length of three minutes and twenty-nine seconds.

Track listing

Charts

Release history

References

2017 singles
2017 songs
Madcon songs
Sony Music singles
Songs written by Josh Wilkinson
Songs written by Ki Fitzgerald